Sir Henry Simpson Newland,  (24 November 1873 – 13 November 1969) was a distinguished Australian surgeon.

As president of the Australian War Service League he was active in promoting selective conscription and martial law during the Second World War.

The Henry Simpson Newland Prize is named in his honour. The medal was first awarded by the Federal Council of the British Medical Association in Australia, and since 1956, by the Australian Medical Association.

He is commemorated by a plaque on the Jubilee 150 Walkway. A portrait of Newland by Ivor Hele won the 1953 Archibald Prize.

Family
 Grandfather: Ridgway William Newland
 Father: Simpson Newland
 Brother: Victor Marra Newland
 Brother: Phil Newland

References

External links
 Hicks, N. and Leopold, E. Newland, Sir Henry Simpson (1873–1969), Australian Dictionary of Biography, Volume 11, Melbourne University Press, 1988, pp 8–9.
 
 Pearn, J. H. The heritage of the Royal Australian Army Medical Corps in bronze
 Sir Henry Simpson Newland, South Australian Medical Heritage Society Inc
 Newland House, 80 Brougham Place, North Adelaide, South Australian Medical Heritage Society Inc

1873 births
1969 deaths
Military personnel from South Australia
Australian Army officers
Australian Commanders of the Order of the British Empire
Australian Companions of the Distinguished Service Order
Australian Fellows of the Royal College of Surgeons
Australian Knights Bachelor
Australian surgeons
People from Adelaide
University of Adelaide Medical School alumni